William Davenport (born 1960, Evansville, Indiana) is a documentary filmmaker, musician, publisher, writer, teacher and autism activist. He is best known for his documentary films about autism, also for his work as the publisher of Unsound magazine, and as the founding member of the experimental/noise band Problemist.

Documentary director
In 2011 Davenport directed the feature documentary Too Sane for This World. This film explores the challenges, gifts and unique perspectives of 12 adults on the autism spectrum. The film features an introduction by Dr. Temple Grandin. Many adults on the autism spectrum discover their condition much later in life, some being diagnosed as late as the age of forty. Knowing that you are on the spectrum can bring a great relief and understanding of oneself, but also a label that brings its own set of discrimination.

In getting these important points across, the film benefits from a remarkably articulate set of interviewees, several of them high achievers by anyone's standards. Simply by being there, they should go some way toward easing the fears of parents with kids on the spectrum. There are also interviewees who describe themselves as 'slow', however, and talk about the difficulties they had at school. Assured and assertive as they are (partly thanks to interview questions designed by other people with autism), they're a reassuring example for people with all kinds of different problems in childhood, and their inclusion highlights how rarely we hear any such voices. Between them, these diverse people do an effective job of putting across where the differences are that make fitting into mainstream society so difficult. Their different backgrounds keep their stories interesting and they quickly do away with the notion that autistic people have no sense of humor. This contributes to the film's other achievement - illustrating how much common ground there is and showing that mutual understanding, whilst it may pose challenges, is far from impossible.

In 2013, Davenport directed the feature documentary Citizen Autistic. The history of civil rights in America has been marked by the hard-won progress of one category after another of oppressed and marginalized citizens who stand up and demand recognition, respect, and equal access to the benefits of modern society. William Davenport's film Citizen Autistic brings us an inside look at the front lines of the autistic civil rights movement, showcasing activists who experience autism and self-advocates on the front lines of this struggle for inclusion, and freedom from persecution. Featuring notable figures such as Ari Ne'eman, co-founder and former president of the Autistic Self Advocacy Network, and Landon Bryce, of thAutcast.com, this documentary details what the emerging neurodiversity movement is up against, from the torturous electroshock "treatment" that takes place at the Judge Rotenberg Center in Massachusetts, to the dehumanizing and alarmist marketing campaigns of fundraising juggernaut Autism Speaks. Promoting a philosophy of neurological variation as simply another aspect of human diversity, these tireless activists embody the call of the disability rights movement: "Nothing About Us, Without Us." In 2014 Davenport released the short documentary Conquering Heights.  In 2013, Davenport directed a music video for the band Array, which features Robyn Steward and Mark Tinley, who are both on the autism spectrum. The video is for the song, "Spacecadet" was released on April 2, 2013 - World Autism Day. Davenport has been completed a series of films that focus on the music and zine scenes that originated in the 1980s. In 2015 Davenport completed a series of documentary films that explore the world of experimental and noise music titled Unsound Redux. The series consists of four films: "Great American Cassette Masters", "The New Punks", "Ziners", and "The People's Music". Continuing his interest in experimental music Davenport completed two documentaries in 2018: "Media About Media about Media: The Negativland Story" and "Hunting Lodge: The Story of Two Nomad Souls".

Autism activist
Other than producing documentary films, Davenport is also active in the international autism community. Davenport was a member of the San Francisco Marin Autism Taskforce. From 2007-2011, Davenport was the executive director of the non-profit organization Autism Social Connection; it was there that he developed his practice of teaching filmmaking to adults, teens and children on the autism spectrum. He has worked extensively with the San Francisco Bay Area autism organization Autism, Asperger's Coalition for Education, Networking and Development, and the Washington D.C. based organization ASAN (Autistic Self Advocacy Network). In the United Kingdom, Davenport has collaborated with C.R.A.E. (Centre for Research in Autism and Education) and the charity – Ambitious about Autism – on free screenings of his films followed by panel discussions. Davenport presently is the executive director of Autism House, a Eugene, Oregon based non-profit organization.

Publisher and editor
Unsound was a magazine published in San Francisco by William Davenport, who was also in the band Problemist. There were 8 issues published between 1983-86. Unsound was one of the earlier US based publications with any longevity that covered the industrial/noise/punk/experimental underground.  The first issue of Unsound was published in September, 1983. It came about as a reaction against separatism, in which 'a select few become the only creative sources that are recognized.' Unsound focused on the harder edge of experimental art and music – the edge that most consider subversive. Artists/groups covered in the past have been Negativland, Glenn Branca, Ellen Zweig, Einsturzende Neubauten, Karen Finley, Boyd Rice (NON), Minimal Man, Sonic Youth, Whitehouse, Psychic TV, and Leslie Thornton.

All cover art was done by different visual artists, some being Jo Babcock, Allan Winkler, Trevor Brown, Didier Cremieux. Unsound was a networking tool where information was listed and exchanged – areas included radio, publications, distribution, mail art, extensive tape and record reviews, and other assorted network and contacts. The issues also included interviews with Blixa Bargeld of Einsturzende Neubauten, Remko Scha, Michael Gira/Swans, Genesis P-Orridge, John Balance & Peter Christopherson/Coil, Kronos Quartet, an overview of the Los Angeles experimental electronic scene of the time, and much more.

Music
Davenport grew up in Southern California where he played in various punk bands in the mid-seventies, this is also where he began experimenting with synthesizers and tape manipulation. Founded in 1980, Problemist was an assortment of musicians, centered around William Davenport. His long time collaborator was Christopher Rankin of Sabot. His first solo tape experiments were "Flat Child" and "Revolutionary Sex", both self-released. Davenport then began a three-year collaboration with Chris Rankin (Sabot). In 1982, they released "Pop Religion is Love", and in 1983, "What is to be-Gun" on the Another Room Public Hearings label. The band then signed to Sordide Sentimental Records of France and released "Nine Times Sanity". Problemist continued to release a number of recordings and appears on numerous compilations throughout the 80's. The hallmark of the group was Davenport's wailing vocals and complex lyrics. He performed enigmatic live performances throughout the 1980s, some of which were chronicled in the audio release Problemist Live, 1981-1985. Davenport stopped performing and recording in 1990.

Soundtracks
He created soundtracks primarily for the video artist Steve Fagin, "Virtual Play: The Double Direct Monkey Wrench in Black's Machinery"  (1984). The Amazing Voyage of Gustave Flaubert and Raymond Roussel (1986)  The Machine the Killed Bad People" (1990).

Discography

Filmography

References

1960 births
Living people
American documentary filmmakers